Peter Stoyanovich (born April 28, 1967) is an American football placekicker of Macedonian descent. His father Mijalce and his mother Slobodanka are from Ljubojno, North Macedonia. He played with the Miami Dolphins, Kansas City Chiefs and briefly the St. Louis Rams in the National Football League (NFL). He attended college at Indiana University where he played both football and soccer.

A first-team all-pro in 1992, Stoyanovich finished his career in the top 35 in NFL history in all kicking categories. He led the NFL in scoring in 1992. His game-tying 58-yard field goal in a 1991 Wild Card playoff set a record for the longest field goal in NFL playoff history, which has since been tied by Graham Gano in 2018. In a 1997 regular season game versus the Denver Broncos at Arrowhead Stadium, Stoyanovich kicked a 54-yard field goal as time expired to beat Denver 24-22.

Stoyanovich served as the kicking double for Sean Young in Ace Ventura, Pet Detective.

NFL career statistics

References

 

1967 births
Living people
American football placekickers
Indiana Hoosiers football players
Kansas City Chiefs players
Miami Dolphins players
St. Louis Rams players
Sportspeople from Dearborn, Michigan
People from Livonia, Michigan
Players of American football from Michigan
American people of Macedonian descent